Albert Phillip House (1890 – 29 May 1966) was a New Zealand rugby union and professional rugby league footballer who played in the 1900s and 1910s, and rugby league referee of the 1910s and 1920s .

Playing career
House originally played rugby union, representing Wellington.

In 1908 House switched to rugby league, playing for Wellington in the first provincial matches, against Auckland.

In 1912 House was part of the Petone side in the inaugural Wellington Rugby League competition. Petone were the first winners of the Siegal Cup.

House played , i.e. number 4 in Wellington's 33–18 victory over Auckland during the 1913 New Zealand rugby league season Inter-district competition on Saturday 27 September 1913, this would be Wellington's last victory against Auckland until 1988. He again played for New Zealand, against New South Wales, that year.

Refereeing career
House later became a rugby league referee. In 1919 he became the first, of only four Kiwis test players, to referee a test match when the Kiwis played Australia at the Basin Reserve.

Death
House died in 1966 and was buried at Karori Cemetery in Wellington.

Honoured at Petone Panthers

References

External links
Roll of Honour at nzrl.co.nz
Past Kiwis → H at nzrl.co.nz

1890 births
1966 deaths
Australian emigrants to New Zealand
Burials at Karori Cemetery
New Zealand national rugby league team players
New Zealand rugby league players
New Zealand rugby league referees
New Zealand rugby union players
North Sydney Bears players
People from Buninyong
Petone Panthers players
Place of birth missing
Place of death missing
Rugby league centres
Rugby league five-eighths
Rugby league fullbacks
Wellington rugby league team players
Wellington rugby union players